Timo Nieminen (born October 6, 1981 in Helsinki) is a retired professional Finnish tennis player.

He reached his highest ATP Tour singles ranking of World No. 254 in July 2003. Nieminen primarily played on the Futures circuit and the Challenger circuit. He has been a member of the Finland Davis Cup team since 2002, posting a 2–12 record in singles and 0–1 record in doubles in 12 ties.

He has no relation to Jarkko Nieminen.

Tour singles titles - all levels (16)

See also
List of Finland Davis Cup team representatives

References

External links

 
 
 

1981 births
Living people
Finnish male tennis players
Sportspeople from Helsinki